Earlham is a city in Madison County, Iowa, United States. The population was 1,410 at the time of the 2020 census. It is part of the Des Moines–West Des Moines Metropolitan Statistical Area.

History
Earlham was laid out in 1869 when the railroad was extended to that point. It was named after Earlham College, a Quaker college in Richmond, Indiana. Earlham was incorporated on April 26, 1870.

Geography
Earlham is located at  (41.493137, -94.123661).

Demographics

2010 census
As of the census of 2010, there were 1,450 people, 544 households, and 389 families living in the city. The racial makeup of the city was 98.3% White, 0.1% African American, 0.5% Asian, 0.2% from other races, and 0.9% from two or more races. Hispanic or Latino of any race were 0.8% of the population.

There were 544 households, of which 41.9% had children under the age of 18 living with them, 59.2% were married couples living together, 8.5% had a female householder with no husband present, 3.9% had a male householder with no wife present, and 28.5% were non-families. 24.8% of all households were made up of individuals, and 10.5% had someone living alone who was 65 years of age or older. The average household size was 2.67 and the average family size was 3.22.

The median age in the city was 34.3 years. 31.6% of residents were under the age of 18; 6.2% were between the ages of 18 and 24; 30.3% were from 25 to 44; 20.8% were from 45 to 64; and 11.2% were 65 years of age or older. The gender makeup of the city was 50.0% male and 50.0% female.

2000 census
As of the census of 2000, there were 1,298 people, 491 households, and 352 families living in the city. The racial makeup of the city was 99.31% White, 0.15% African American, 0.08% Native American, and 0.46% from two or more races. Hispanic or Latino of any race were 0.62% of the population.

There were 491 households, out of which 39.1% had children under the age of 18 living with them, 61.9% were married couples living together, 7.7% had a female householder with no husband present, and 28.3% were non-families. 24.8% of all households were made up of individuals, and 13.8% had someone living alone who was 65 years of age or older. The average household size was 2.59 and the average family size was 3.11.

Age spread: 29.5% under the age of 18, 7.1% from 18 to 24, 32.7% from 25 to 44, 17.4% from 45 to 64, and 13.3% who were 65 years of age or older. The median age was 33 years. For every 100 females, there were 95.5 males. For every 100 females age 18 and over, there were 91.4 males.

The median income for a household in the city was $42,917, and the median income for a family was $54,519. Males had a median income of $32,262 versus $24,896 for females. The per capita income for the city was $20,659. About 0.9% of families and 3.8% of the population were below the poverty line, including 1.8% of those under age 18 and 5.4% of those age 65 or over.

Education
Earlham is served by the Earlham Community School District.

Notes

References

External links
The Community of Earlham Iowa Website Portal style website, Government, Business, Library, Recreation and more
City-Data.com Comprehensive Statistical Data and more about Earlham

Cities in Iowa
Cities in Madison County, Iowa
Des Moines metropolitan area
Populated places established in 1869
1869 establishments in Iowa